Abbie Gardner-Sharp (1843 – January 17, 1921) was born in 1843 to Rowland Gardner and Frances M. Smith. She was the third of four children, Mary M., Eliza M., and Rowland, youngest child and only son.

On March 8, 1857, Abbie was abducted during the Spirit Lake Massacre. By May, the young teen was ransomed and returned to white society. Gardner had a long history of illness after the event, likely due to what we today call post-traumatic stress disorder, or PTSD.

Very soon after returning home, Abbie married at the tender age of 14 to Casville Sharp (then 18 years old), with whom she had three children. Her memoir of the abduction and captivity provided income for Abbie and her family, and it went into seven editions during her lifetime. In 1891, she purchased the property and cabin from which she was abducted and near where her parents and siblings were buried. The site became a popular tourist attraction and she operated it as a small museum and gift shop.

Abbie died on January 17, 1921, and was buried with her birth family near the Abbie Gardner Sharp cabin, which still stands near Arnold's Park in Spirit Lake, Iowa.

See also
List of kidnappings
List of solved missing person cases

References

External links
 Contemporary news article pertaining to the death of Abbie Gardner-Sharp

1843 births
1850s missing person cases
1921 deaths
19th-century American memoirists
19th-century American women
American people taken hostage
American women memoirists
Formerly missing people
Kidnapped American people
Missing person cases in Iowa